The 2012–13 First Vienna FC season was the fourth consecutive season in the second highest professional division in Austria after the promotion in 2009.

Squad

Squad and statistics

|-
! colspan="12" style="background:#dcdcdc; text-align:center;"| Goalkeepers

|-
! colspan="12" style="background:#dcdcdc; text-align:center;"| Defenders

|-
! colspan="12" style="background:#dcdcdc; text-align:center;"| Midfielders

|-
! colspan="12" style="background:#dcdcdc; text-align:center;"| Forwards

|}

References

Vienna
First Vienna FC seasons